The Bellone class was a group of three submarines built for the French Navy during World War I.

Ships
Two of these three ships, the Gorgone and the Hermione, served in the Adriatic during World War I.  The third ship, the Bellone, operated in the Atlantic during that time.  As of 1935, all three ships were in the French Mediterranean Fleet, and during that year were stricken (i.e. removed from the naval register).

See also 
List of submarines of France

Notes

Bibliography

 

Submarine classes
World War I submarines of France
Ship classes of the French Navy